Epicastini is a tribe of longhorn beetles of the subfamily Lamiinae. It was described by Thomson in 1864.

Taxonomy
 Brachaciptera Lea, 1917
 Dysthaeta Pascoe, 1859
 Oricopis Pascoe, 1863
 Paroricopis Breuning, 1958

References